Josiane Stoléru is a French film, television and theatre actress.

Stoléru was born and raised in Lyon, France. Her cousin was the late French politician Lionel Stoléru.

She is married to fellow actor Patrick Chesnais, and their daughter Émilie Chesnais is also an actress.

Selected filmography
Cyrano de Bergerac (1990), as the Duenna
Something Fishy (1994)
A Piece of Sky (2002), as Mme. Picri
Wild Side (2004), as the mother
Bicycling with Molière (2013), as Raphaelle La Puisaye
The Mystery of Henri Pick (2019), as Madeleine Pick

References

Living people
Actresses from Lyon
French film actresses
French television actresses
French stage actresses
French people of Romanian descent
20th-century French actresses
21st-century French actresses
Year of birth missing (living people)